Jeff Davis County is a county located in the southeastern part of the U.S. state of Georgia. As of the 2020 census, the population was 14,779. The county seat is Hazlehurst. The county was created on August 18, 1905, and named for Jefferson Davis, the only Confederate president.

Geography

Most of the northern border area, as well as part of the western border of Jeff Davis County, from northeast of Hazlehurst to west of Denton, is located in the Lower Ocmulgee River sub-basin of the Altamaha River basin. Most of the eastern corner of the county, east of Hazlehurst and north of Graham, is located in the Altamaha River sub-basin of the larger basin by the same name. The central and southeastern portion of Jeff Davis County, south of Hazlehurst, is located in the Little Satilla River sub-basin of the St. Marys-Satilla River basin. The remaining central and southern portion of the county is located in the Satilla River sub-basin of the St. Marys-Satilla River basin.

Major highways

  U.S. Route 23
  U.S. Route 221
  U.S. Route 341
  State Route 19
  State Route 19 Connector
  State Route 27
  State Route 107
  State Route 135
  State Route 135 Connector
  State Route 268

Adjacent counties
 Wheeler County (north)
 Montgomery County (northeast)
 Toombs County (northeast)
 Appling County (southeast)
 Bacon County (southeast)
 Coffee County (southwest)
 Telfair County (northwest)

Demographics

2000 census
As of the census of 2000, there were 12,684 people, 4,828 households, and 3,592 families living in the county.  The population density was 38 people per square mile (15/km2).  There were 5,581 housing units at an average density of 17 per square mile (6/km2).  The racial makeup of the county was 81.20% White, 15.14% Black or African American, 0.24% Native American, 0.44% Asian, 0.04% Pacific Islander, 2.39% from other races, and 0.55% from two or more races.  5.13% of the population were Hispanic or Latino of any race.

There were 4,828 households, out of which 35.70% had children under the age of 18 living with them, 56.50% were married couples living together, 13.60% had a female householder with no husband present, and 25.60% were non-families. 22.30% of all households were made up of individuals, and 9.10% had someone living alone who was 65 years of age or older.  The average household size was 2.61 and the average family size was 3.02.

In the county, the population was spread out, with 27.20% under the age of 18, 9.30% from 18 to 24, 28.20% from 25 to 44, 23.30% from 45 to 64, and 11.90% who were 65 years of age or older.  The median age was 35 years. For every 100 females, there were 96.50 males.  For every 100 females age 18 and over, there were 93.60 males.

The median income for a household in the county was $27,310, and the median income for a family was $30,930. Males had a median income of $26,261 versus $20,095 for females. The per capita income for the county was $13,780.  About 16.80% of families and 19.40% of the population were below the poverty line, including 21.70% of those under age 18 and 22.10% of those ages 65 or over.

2010 census
As of the 2010 United States Census, there were 15,068 people, 5,689 households, and 4,079 families living in the county. The racial makeup of the county was 76.1% white, 14.8% black or African American, 0.5% Asian, 0.2% American Indian, 7.3% from other races, and 1.2% from two or more races. Those of Hispanic or Latino origin made up 10.5% of the population. In terms of ancestry, 14.2% were American, 7.5% were Irish, and 5.7% were English.

Of the 5,689 households, 38.5% had children under the age of 18 living with them, 50.4% were married couples living together, 15.6% had a female householder with no husband present, 28.3% were non-families, and 24.2% of all households were made up of individuals. The average household size was 2.63 and the average family size was 3.10. The median age was 36.0 years.

The median income for a household in the county was $32,928 and the median income for a family was $40,313. Males had a median income of $33,340 versus $27,126 for females. The per capita income for the county was $15,730. About 14.9% of families and 24.0% of the population were below the poverty line, including 31.2% of those under age 18 and 19.5% of those age 65 or over.

2020 census

As of the 2020 United States census, there were 14,779 people, 5,279 households, and 3,790 families residing in the county.

Communities

Cities
 Denton
 Hazlehurst

Census-designated place
 Satilla

Politics

See also

 National Register of Historic Places listings in Jeff Davis County, Georgia
List of counties in Georgia

References

External links
 Jeff Davis County historical marker

 
Georgia (U.S. state) counties
1905 establishments in Georgia (U.S. state)
Populated places established in 1905